Olivia Diaz (born 1978 in Las Vegas, Nevada), is an American elementary school teacher and politician who served as a Democratic member of the Nevada Assembly from 2011 until 2018 representing District 11. Diaz is a member of the National Hispanic Caucus of State Legislators.

Education
Diaz earned her BA in English from the University of Nevada, Las Vegas and her MS in bilingual education from Nova Southeastern University.

Elections
2012 Diaz was unopposed for both the June 12, 2012 Democratic Primary and the November 6, 2012 General election, winning with 8,145 votes.
2010 When Democratic Assemblyman Ruben Kihuen ran for Nevada Senate and left the District 11 seat open, Diaz won the three-way June 8, 2010 Democratic Primary with 781 votes (83.44%), and won the November 2, 2010 General election with 3,162 votes (80.95%) against Republican nominee Von Brewer.

On December 3, 2018. Diaz announced her intention to resign and seek election to Las Vegas City Council Ward 3. Bea Duran of the Culinary Workers Union was appointed to fill her place.

References

External links
Official page at the Nevada Legislature
Campaign site
 

Date of birth missing (living people)
1978 births
Living people
Hispanic and Latino American city council members
Hispanic and Latino American state legislators in Nevada
Hispanic and Latino American women in politics
Democratic Party members of the Nevada Assembly
Nova Southeastern University alumni
People from North Las Vegas, Nevada
University of Nevada, Las Vegas alumni
Las Vegas City Council members
Women state legislators in Nevada
21st-century American politicians
21st-century American women politicians
Women city councillors in Nevada